Everest Pipkin is a drawing, game, and software artist from Central Texas, who produces intimate work with large data sets.

Early life
Pipkin's parents worked with a nonprofit organization called The Nobelity Project, and they began their artistic career as a young teen taking photographs for the organization's work. Pipkin graduated from Westlake High School in 2008, studied on a Young Masters grant at the Art Academy of San Francisco and Paris American Academy and finished by receiving a BFA at the University of Texas and an MFA Carnegie Mellon University.

Work

Pipkin makes drawings, computational artwork, generative poetry and other software, including games.

From 2011 to 2013, Pipkin ran Wardenclyffe Gallery, an Austin multidisciplinary art space. In 2013, Pipkin was a part of exhibitions at Greyduck Gallery, The Texas Biennial, and Fusebox Festival.

In 2016, Pipkin contributed to the art game anthology Triennale Game Collection with the piece The Worm Room, using images from the Biodiversity Heritage Library. An updated standalone release was published in 2020.

In 2020 Pipkin created a tool called "Image Scrubber" in response to Black Lives Matter protests that allowed protesters to blur out faces and remove metadata from their images, this tool became widely used during the movement to protect protesters' safety. That same year they also created Shell Song, an interactive audio narrative game that explores deepfake voice technologies and the data sets behind them.

Awards
As an undergraduate student, Pipkin was named All State Artist by the Texas Art Education Association. In 2012, Pipkin won Artist of the Year - Early Career in the Austin Visual Arts Awards. Pipkin was a Hunting Art Prize finalist in 2015 and 2016.

References

External links

Living people
University of Texas at Austin College of Fine Arts alumni
Artists from Austin, Texas
21st-century American artists
Year of birth missing (living people)
American LGBT artists
Non-binary artists
Texas socialists
American socialists